The Beijing X7 is a mid-size crossover SUV produced by Beijing, a sub-brand of BAIC Motor.

Development 

The Beijing X7 was previewed by the Yao concept car which introduced the new family design language of the revamped brand from BAIC Motor.

The Beijing X7 is built on the BMFA (Beijing modular functional architecture) platform by BAIC Motor. The platform will underpin future traditional fuel vehicle models and plug-in hybrid vehicle models. According to BAIC, the Beijing X7 started pre-sale in May 2020 and was  officially listed in June 2020.

Specifications 

The Beijing X7 is available with two power combinations, the 1.5-litre turbo gasoline engine and the plug-in hybrid version with the 1.5-litre turbo gasoline engine. The transmission system is available with options including a 6-speed manual gearbox or a 7-speed dual-clutch transmission.

The Beijing X7 features AR live navigation, IoV, and vehicle interconnection systems. Active conversational voice interaction can also be realized via the in-vehicle interconnection system. Additionally, the Beijing X7 is also equipped with face recognition function, automatic seat adjustment, and active fatigue driving monitoring. For safety features, the X7 is equipped with 17 configurations including one-key automatic parking and traffic congestion assistance, with L2 level driving assistance enabled via software updates.

References

External links 
 
 
Crossover sport utility vehicles
Cars introduced in 2020
Cars of China
BAIC Group vehicles